Emily Andras is a Canadian television producer and writer. She is known for creating the television series Wynonna Earp and serving as executive producer and showrunner of Lost Girl (seasons 3 and 4).

Early life
Andras was born in Boston, Massachusetts, United States, and raised in Calgary, Alberta, Canada. She earned an English degree from Queen's University in Kingston, Ontario, Canada, and received her Bachelor of Applied Arts (Radio and Television) from the RTA School of Media at Ryerson University in Toronto, Ontario.

Career
Emily Andras created the Wynonna Earp series after her work on Lost Girl, where she was a writer and consulting producer for the first two seasons, showrunner and executive producer of seasons 3 and 4, and executive consulting producer in its fifth and final season.

Prior to Lost Girl, she served on Instant Star as showrunner and executive producer, for which she began as a junior writer on the series. Prior to Wynonna Earp being greenlit, she was a writer and consulting producer on Killjoys during its development and first season.

In 2008, she was nominated for a Gemini Award for Best Writing in a Children's or Youth's Program or Series, for Instant Star episode "Like A Virgin". She was nominated in 2013 for a Canadian Screen Award (CSA) for Best Writing in a Dramatic Series for Lost Girl episode "Into the Dark". In 2017, she received a CSA for Best Cross-Platform Project – Fiction for Wynonna Earp Interactive, and was nominated for Best Writing in a Dramatic Series for Wynonna Earp episode "Purgatory". In 2018, she was nominated for a CSA for Best Writing in a Dramatic Series for Wynonna Earp episode "I Hope You Dance". In 2019, she received the WGC Showrunner Award by the Writers Guild of Canada.

Filmography

Television

References

External links 
 

21st-century Canadian screenwriters
21st-century Canadian women writers
Canadian television producers
Canadian television writers
Canadian women screenwriters
Canadian women television producers
Canadian women television writers
Television show creators
Showrunners
Writers from Boston
Toronto Metropolitan University alumni
Queen's University at Kingston alumni